Sverre Hansen (12 November 1899 – 25 February 1991) was a Norwegian long jumper. At the 1924 Summer Olympics he won a bronze medal with a jump of 7.26 metres. He became Norwegian champion in long jump in 1921-1924. His personal best jump was 7.285 metres, achieved in August 1924 in Kristiania.

References

1899 births
1991 deaths
Norwegian male long jumpers
Athletes (track and field) at the 1924 Summer Olympics
Olympic athletes of Norway
Olympic bronze medalists for Norway
Medalists at the 1924 Summer Olympics
Olympic bronze medalists in athletics (track and field)
20th-century Norwegian people